Callionymus doryssus, the Japanese filamentous dragonet, is a species of dragonet native to the Pacific waters around Japan.

References 

D
Fish described in 1903
Taxa named by David Starr Jordan